Channel Island cattle is a collective name for the breeds of cattle developed in the Channel Islands located between England and France. The breeds which can be so described are the Jersey, the Guernsey and the Alderney.

See also
Channel Island milk

References

Channel Island Cattle

Cattle